The Bowman 45 is an ocean-cruising yacht produced by Rustler Yachts of Falmouth. The yacht is traditionally lined and styled, but is built from solid glassfibre composite with a fin and skeg underwater profile.

To achieve a good seakeeping ability for ocean cruising, the yacht is heavily constructed, and well ballasted. In addition, the yacht incorporates a strong skeg hung rudder. The production of the yachts on a semi-custom basis, and the small numbers of yachts produced each year, result in a significantly higher purchase cost than comparable yachts from mass-production companies. The yacht is available in various degrees of part-completion as well as in factory-finished form.

See also
Bowman Yachts
Bowman 42
Bowman 48
Rustler 42
Rustler 44

References

External links
Bowman Yachts
Bowman 45

Sailing yachts